Judy Huxtable (born 4 July 1942) is a British actress.

Early life and career
Born in Surrey, England, to wealthy parents, Huxtable was initially a society débutante and then became a fashionable figure in 1960s "swinging London" and, as a model, was represented by the William Morris Agency. She was the face of Bacardi rum and Fry’s Chocolate.

Huxtable's film appearances include Les Bicyclettes de Belsize (1968), the cult film The Touchables (1968), and several horror films.

Personal life
Huxtable was first married to Irish theatre designer Sean Kenny, but later divorced him. In 1973 she became the second wife of the satirist Peter Cook and appeared with him on the 1977 Godley & Creme concept album Consequences, together with a brief appearance in his 1979 comedy film Derek and Clive Get the Horn, co-starring Dudley Moore. They were divorced in 1989, owing to Cook's drinking, after many years of amicable separation.

In 2008 she published an autobiography, Loving Peter, in which she described her turbulent relationship with Cook and living with his alcoholism, which mirrored her experiences with her own mother. Huxtable published the book under her married name of Judy Cook.

Filmography
 Piccadilly Third Stop (1960) - Bride
 Those Magnificent Men in their Flying Machines (1965) - Girl at Dover Beach (uncredited)
 Licensed to Kill (1965) - Computer Center Girl
 The Psychopath (1966) - Louise Saville
 The Touchables (1968) - Sadie
 Les Bicyclettes de Belsize (1968) - The Girl ('Julie')
 Scream and Scream Again (1970) - Sylvia
 Every Home Should Have One (1970) - Frankenstein Heroine
 Up the Chastity Belt (1971) - Gretel
 Die Screaming, Marianne (1971) - Hildegard
 Nobody Ordered Love (1972) - Caroline Johnson
 Derek and Clive Get the Horn (1979) - Judy Cook (herself)

References

External links
 why are there two Wiki entries with two different dates of birth, and two different book credits?

1942 births
English film actresses
Living people
Actresses from London